Nicolas Bernard Lépicié (16 June 1735 – 15 September 1784) was a French painter and teacher of painting, the son of two well-known engravers at the time, François-Bernard Lépicié and Renée-Élisabeth Marlié.  Lépicié was famous in his lifetime, and compared to Chardin and Greuze.

Life 
Nicolas-Bernard studied with leading artists of the century including Carle Vanloo.  In 1769 he was accepted into the Royal Academy of Painting and Sculpture in Paris. Three years later, in 1772, he became an assistant professor and, in 1777, a professor.  He taught important names such as Carle Vernet, Jean-Frederic Schall, Jean-Antoine-Théodore Giroust, Jean-Joseph Taillasson, Henri-Pierre Danloux, Jean-Baptiste Regnault and Nicolas-Antoine Taunay.

Work 
Lépicié's work was visibly influenced by his father's friend, Jean-Baptiste-Siméon Chardin, whose themes were a source of inspiration.  Lépicié's subjects range from portraits (Le Petit Dessinateur -1772; The Astronomer (i.e. Pierre Charles Le Monnier) - 1777)  to history paintings (Achilles and the Centaur Chiron - 1769) and genre scenes (A Mother Feeding her Child  - 1774, Cour de ferme - 1784).

Gallery

References 
Site officiel du musée du Louvre
Nicolas Bernard Lépicié
 Philippe-Gaston Dreyfus, "Une dernière volonté de Nicolas-Bernard Lépicié" Bulletin de la Société de l'histoire de l'art français, 1er fascicule, Nogent-le-Rotrou, Daupeley-Gouverneur, 1910

18th-century French painters
French male painters
Prix de Rome for painting
1735 births
Painters from Paris
1784 deaths
18th-century French male artists